Pentacalia moronensis is a species of flowering plant in the family Asteraceae. It is found only in Ecuador. Its natural habitat is subtropical or tropical moist lowland forests. It is threatened by habitat loss.

References

moronensis
Flora of Ecuador
Vulnerable plants
Taxonomy articles created by Polbot